Wymark is a hamlet in Swift Current Rural Municipality No. 137, Saskatchewan, Canada. Listed as a designated place by Statistics Canada, the hamlet had a population of 144 in the Canada 2006 Census. The hamlet is located on Highway 628 about 2 km north of Highway 363, and 15 km south of Swift Current.

Etymology

Wymark was named after William Wymark Jacobs, an English writer best known for his 1902 story The Monkey's Paw.

Demographics 

See also

 List of communities in Saskatchewan
 Hamlets of Saskatchewan

References

Designated places in Saskatchewan
Organized hamlets in Saskatchewan
Swift Current No. 137, Saskatchewan